Baeolidia ransoni is a species of sea slug, an aeolid nudibranch. It is a marine gastropod mollusc in the family Aeolidiidae.

Distribution
The holotype of this species was collected in Koukura Is, Tuamotu Archipelago, in the central Pacific Ocean. It has been reported from Japan, Indonesia and Australia.

Description
The body of Baeolidia ransoni is translucent white. The cerata are overlaid with brown spots, which are groups of zooxanthellae.

Ecology
Baeolidia ransoni feeds on colonial sea anemones of the genus Palythoa.

References

Aeolidiidae
Gastropods described in 1985